Ashireddipally is a village panchayat in Chityal mandal in Jayashankar Bhupalpally district in the state of Telangana in India.

Location
Ashireddipally is 72 km from Warangal (next to Tekumatla traveling from Chityal towards Garmillapally). The Godavari River is near Ashireddipally.

Population
The population is around 1,200.
Ashireddipally's grama panchayat sarpanch is moguli moitya, who was elected in the 2013 grama panchayiti elections.

Transport
Ashireddipally has a bus route. Buses are available from Parkal and Hanmakonda to Giddemutharam, Venkatrao Pally, or Garmillapally. Trains are available from nearby Jammikunta.

Places of interest

Ashireddipally has three temples: Venkateshwara Swamy Temple, Hanuman Temple, and Baddi Pochamma Temple so it is written by sanikommuanureddy.

Education
Ashireddipally has a government primary school. High school is available in nearby Tekumatla.

Economy
Ashireddipally's economy is largely dependent on agriculture. 85% of the population depends on agriculture and related activities. Cotton, red chills, rice, and bananas are common crops. Most of the youth are well educated and working in various jobs in India and abroad.

References

Villages in Jayashankar Bhupalpally district